David Berger (May 9, 1920November 15, 1966) was an American artist. Berger was a professor of art at Massachusetts College of Art, where he had been a member of the faculty since 1957. He was also a professor of art at Framingham State College from 1946 to 1957.

Early life and education
Berger was born in Lawrence, Massachusetts in 1920. Berger received a Bachelor of Science in education from the Massachusetts College of Art in 1946, and a Master of Fine Arts Degree from Cranbrook Academy of Art, Michigan in 1950.

Collections
DeCordova Museum
Blanton Museum of Art
Bradley University
Worcester Art Museum
Boston Public Library (Impressions Workshop and Albert H. Wiggin Collections)
Butler Institute of American Art
Danforth Art
Museum of the University of New Hampshire
Ogunquit Museum of American Art
Museum of Fine Arts, Boston
Smithsonian Archives of American Art.

References 

1920 births
1966 deaths
20th-century American male artists
Massachusetts College of Art and Design faculty
People from Lawrence, Massachusetts
Framingham State University faculty
Massachusetts College of Art and Design alumni
Cranbrook Academy of Art alumni